The Pahranagat spinedace, (''Lepidomeda altivelis')' is an extinct fish that originally inhabited the Pahranagat Valley in Nevada, United States.

References

 
 
 
 natureserve.org

Lepidomeda
Fish of the Western United States
Fish of North America becoming extinct since 1500
Extinct animals of the United States
Fish described in 1960